Esa Juhani Keskinen (born 3 February 1965 in Ylöjärvi, Finland) is a retired Finnish professional ice hockey forward.

Playing career 
Keskinen was drafted by the Calgary Flames as their fifth-round pick, 101st overall, in the 1985 NHL Entry Draft, but never played in the NHL anytime in his active playing career.

Playing for HV71 in the Swedish Elitserien, he won the Swedish national championship during the 1994–95 season. During the 1995–96 season Keskinen formed with his fellow Finn Kai Nurminen a proficient goal-scoring duo, still playing for HV71. During his years in HV71 he was a popular player among the fans and drew by himself large crowds to the club's, at the time, arena Rosenlundshallen.

Keskinen recorded 658 points (215 goals, 443 assists) and 130 penalty minutes in 478 games in SM-liiga playing for TPS and Lukko. In Elitserien he totalled 203 games with 209 points (61 goals, 148 assists) and 148 penalty minutes playing for HV71. He has been noted for most points in SM-liiga in seasons 1987-88 (69 points), 1992–93 (59 points) and 1993-94 (70 points).

Awards 
 Silver medal at the 1988 Winter Olympics.
 Awarded the Veli-Pekka Ketola trophy in 1988, 1993 and 1994.
 SM-liiga champion with TPS in 1993 and 2000.
 Awarded the Kultainen kypärä trophy in 1994.
 Awarded Lasse Oksanen trophy in 1994.
 SM-liiga Best Player of Regular Season 1993–94.
 Bronze medal at the 1994 Winter Olympics.
 Elitserien playoff winner with HV71 in 1995.
 Gold medal at the 1995 Ice Hockey World Championship.
 Awarded Guldhjälmen (Most Valuable Player) in 1996.

Records 
 HV71's club record for assists in one season (41)
 HV71's club record for points in one season (59)

Career statistics

Regular season and playoffs

International

References 

1965 births
Living people
Calgary Flames draft picks
Finnish ice hockey centres
Finnish ice hockey world championship gold medalists
Ice hockey players at the 1988 Winter Olympics
Ice hockey players at the 1994 Winter Olympics
Lukko players
Olympic bronze medalists for Finland
Olympic ice hockey players of Finland
Olympic medalists in ice hockey
Olympic silver medalists for Finland
People from Ylöjärvi
HC TPS players
Medalists at the 1988 Winter Olympics
Medalists at the 1994 Winter Olympics
Sportspeople from Pirkanmaa